Todireni is a commune in Botoșani County, Western Moldavia, Romania. It is composed of five villages: Cernești, Florești, Gârbești, Iurești and Todireni.

Natives
 Maria Baciu

References

Todireni
Localities in Western Moldavia